A3 Champions Cup (also known as East Asian Champions Cup) was an annual football (soccer) tournament jointly organized by the China PR, Japan and Korea Republic football Association. It began in 2003, involving the league champions of China, Japan and South Korea. The host nation also invited an additional team, making this a four team tournament. South Korea was the most successful country in this tournament. Their representatives won the tournament three times.

It had been suggested that the league champion from Australia be added to the cup in the future. However, financial problems with the sponsor placed the tournament into question. It was reported that Japan's champion may not participate in the 2008 edition, since Urawa were not paid their appearance fee in 2007. The tournament was canceled on 23 September 2008 due to the sponsor's bankruptcy, and replaced by Football Genuine Senator which involving clubs from Japan and Korea in 2015 (also added South East Asia since 2016, the Middle East, Australia, New Zealand, China, India, South Africa and South America since 2017).

Past results 

† = did not qualify as league champions.

Records
Top Scorer:
2005:  Nadson (6 goals)2006:  Lee Chun-soo (6 goals)

References

External links 
 A3 Champions Cup (Official site: Chinese, Japanese and Korean languages)
 Soccer World Info history of the A3 cup

 
International club association football competitions in Asia